Gwynia is a genus of very small to minute brachiopods.

Species 
There are two species in the genus:
 Gwynia capsula (Jeffreys, 1859)
 Gwynia macrodentata Lüter, 2008

References 

Terebratulida
Brachiopod genera
Extant Pleistocene first appearances